Kanavadala  is a village located in Jamkandorna Tehsil of Rajkot district in Gujarat, India. It's situated 17 km away from the sub-district headquarters in Jamkandorna and 92 km. away from the district headquarters in Rajkot. As per the 2009 statistics, Kanavadala village is itself a gram Panchayat. According to the 2011 Census, the location code/village code of Kanavadala village is 513276.

The total geographical area of village is 1130.56 hectares. Kanavadala has a total population of 1,321 people and there are about 246 houses in Kanavadala village. Kalavad, approximately 28 km. away, is the nearest town to Kanavadala.

Demographics

Nearby Villages to Kanavadala
 Chavandi
 Dadar
 Dadvi
 Vinzivad
 Pipaliya Agency
 Rajpara
 Gundasari
 Ransiki
 Matravad Nava
 Matravad Juna
 Sultanpur

Village Overview

References

Villages in Rajkot district